The Gracie House is a historic house in New Gascony, Arkansas.  It is located in an agricultural setting south of Arkansas Highway 88, on land that made up what was once Arkansas's largest cotton plantation.  It is a modest -story wood-frame structure, with a wide gable roof and weatherboard siding.  A gable section projects at the right side of the front, with a porch extending across the remainder of the front, recessed under the main roof and supported by Tuscan columns.  A broad gabled dormer pierces the roof above the porch.  The house was built in 1915, and was designed by architects Thompson and Harding as an American Craftsman-influenced bungalow.  It was listed on the National Register of Historic Places in 1982.

See also
National Register of Historic Places listings in Jefferson County, Arkansas

References

Houses on the National Register of Historic Places in Arkansas
Houses completed in 1915
Houses in Jefferson County, Arkansas
American Craftsman architecture in Arkansas
Bungalow architecture in Arkansas
National Register of Historic Places in Jefferson County, Arkansas
1915 establishments in Arkansas